The Monar Jonban (Persian: منار جنبان, meaning shaking minarets), is a monument located in Esfahan, in central Iran. Construction began in the 14th century Safavid or Ilkhanate dynasties of Iran to cover the grave of Sufi Amu Abdollah Soqla. Its notable feature is that if one of the minarets is shaken, the other minaret will shake as well.

History
The iwan (eyvān) and porch were probably erected shortly after 1316 under the Ilkhanate dynasty as a shrine for Sufi Amu Abdollah Soqla, a hermit buried here. The brick minarets were constructed later, and are probably of Safavid dynasty era origin (c. 15th–17th centuries).

The roof above the shrine contains some skilled brickwork.

Shaking minarets

The minarets are responsible for the fame of the otherwise architecturally undistinguished shrine.  Because of the ratio between the height and width of the minarets and the width of the iwan, if one minaret is shaken, the other will shake in unison. This example of coupled oscillation can be observed from ground level. 
Structural damage
The wooden beams on the upper part of the minarets have been placed there to facilitate the shaking of the minarets, but the presence of wood in the brickwork causes other complications. The repeated shaking has been responsible for considerable structural damage.

Shaking by visitors is in theory restricted to once every twenty minutes. However, particularly during holidays, there is a constant stream of people who experiment with the phenomenon. The damage is locally believed by some to have been incurred during the periods of occupation by British soldiers.

However, the most logical reason for the minarets to shake is the physical phenomenon of intensification or Doppler Effect. Because the minarets are light and quite similar, shaking one affects the other. Tourists who have traveled to different parts of the world have introduced minarets in their observations that have the same characteristics in other parts of the world. But it is certain that the minarets of Isfahan are different from other moving minarets, and that is that in addition to the movement of the minarets, other parts of the building also move.  

Imanshahr shaking minarets
There is another pair of shaking minarets also in Isfahan Province, at Imanshahr, of the earlier Ilkhanid dynasty era. They were built during the time of Öljaitü (1280–1316). These have lost the upper two thirds of their height.

Gallery

See also
Safavid art
 Iranian architecture

References

External links
 Isfahan.org: photo
 More Photos, Tishineh

Buildings and structures completed in 1316
14th-century mosques
Mosques in Isfahan
Safavid architecture
Towers in Iran
14th-century architecture